Jordan Thompson may refer to:

 Jordan Thompson (American football) (born 1989), American football player
 Jordan Thompson (cricketer) (born 1996), English cricketer
 Jordan Thompson (footballer) (born 1997), Northern Irish footballer
 Jordan Thompson (rugby league) (born 1991), English rugby league player
 Jordan Thompson (tennis) (born 1994), Australian tennis player
 Jordan Thompson (volleyball) (born 1997), American volleyball player